Hammer pants are modified baggy pants, tapered at the ankle with a sagging rise, made suitable for hip hop dancing. They were popularized in the 1980s and 1990s by American rapper MC Hammer. They were inspired by harem pants, which originated in the Middle East, and were introduced to Western fashion by Paul Poiret around 1910.

Hammer's specialized clothing line would come in a variety of colors and were usually shiny and flashy-styled, as often seen throughout his hip-hop career during talk show appearances, live concerts and music videos (including "U Can't Touch This" and "Pray"). The customized pants appeared again on Hammertime, his 2009 TV reality show.

In 2022, Bobby Brown claimed he started wearing the "diaper pants" that Hammer altered and made famous, on his A&E show Bobby Brown: Every Little Step. However, Brown wore a less sagging variation during some concerts and in music videos, such as "My Prerogative" (1988) and "Every Little Step" (1989).

References

Pants
1990s fashion
Trousers and shorts
Hip hop fashion